Paradise is the second studio album from American R&B artist Billy Lawrence, released June 24, 1997 on East West Records. The album features an appearance from rapper MC Lyte on the first single "Come On", which previously appeared in the soundtrack to the film Set It Off the year before. Also appearing on the album was the then-unknown Van Hunt who played the Wurlitzer on the album's title track.  Paradise also marked the debut of the controversial rap group dead prez who were credited as sticman & M-1 on the song "Footsteps".

Release and reception

The album reached the fifty-seventh spot on the R&B Albums chart.

Track listing

Chart history

Album

Singles

Personnel
Information taken from Allmusic.
art direction – Kiku
assistant engineering – Rawle Gittens, Storm Jefferson, Kenny Stallworth, Mike Wilson
assistant mixing – Ricco Lumpkins
bass – Preston Crump
design – Kiku
drum programming – Organized Noize, Poke & Tone, Rashad Smith
engineering – Darrell "Delite" Allamby, Blake Eiseman, Brian Miller, Lou Ortiz, Chris Theis, Bernasky Wall, John Wydrycs
executive production – Merlin Bobb, Billy Lawrence, Poke & Tone
guitar – Tomi Martin
keyboard programming – Darrell "Delite" Allamby
keyboards – Darrell "Delite" Allamby, Dave Atkinson, Timothy Christian Riley
mixing – Darrell "Delite" Allamby, Carl Nappa, Lou Ortiz, Neil Pogue, Richard Travali
multi-instruments – Darrell "Delite" Allamby
production – Darrell "Delite" Allamby, Dave Atkinson, Billy Lawrence, Organized Noize
programming – Darrell "Delite" Allamby
sampling – Rawle Gittens
vocal production – Darrell "Delite" Allamby, Billy Lawrence
wurlitzer – Van Hunt

Notes

External links
 
 Paradise at Discogs

1997 albums
Albums produced by Organized Noize
Billy Lawrence albums
Warner Records albums